Shen Jiaben (1840 – 1913), alias Jiyi, was a Late Qing Chinese politician and jurist from Huzhou, Zhejiang province.

Shen became a jinshi in 1883. He had been once the Prefect of Tianjin during 1893–7, then the Vice Minister of Justice. He was appointed to be the Secretary of Enactment (修訂法律大臣 or 修律大臣) together with Wu Tingfang. He requested the throne to reorganize the Codification Office into the Enactment Office. He led the translations of foreign laws there after it was ratified.

Shen and Wu were in charge of the 1905 revision of the Qing Code, abolishing several cruel means of punishment such as "slow slicing" (lingchi). Besides, they established Imperial Law College (京師法律學堂) in 1906.

Shen served as the Minister of Justice during 1911–12, in the cabinet of Yuan Shikai.

The first part of his Posthumous Works of Mr. Shen Jiyi [沈寄簃先生遺書] is deemed to be a monograph of great importance on the history of Chinese law.

Cited works

References

Qing dynasty politicians from Zhejiang
1840 births
1913 deaths
Politicians from Huzhou
Scholars of Chinese law
Legal writers
Writers from Huzhou
Qing dynasty writers
Chinese reformers